Tom Morgan may refer to:

Sports
 Tom Morgan (rugby union) (1866–1899), Wales international rugby union player
 Tom Morgan (footballer), football (soccer) manager with Wrexham and Port Vale
 Tom Morgan (baseball) (1930–1987), American baseball player
 Tom Morgan (cricketer) (1893–1975), Welsh cricketer

Other
 Tom Morgan (musician) (born 1970), Australian musician and songwriter
 Tom Morgan (bishop) (born 1941), Canadian Anglican metropolitan bishop
 Tom Morgan (comics), American comic book artist

See also
Thomas Morgan (disambiguation)